Franck Pencolé (born 6 November 1976) is a French former professional road cyclist.

Major results

1997
 9th Paris–Mantes
1998
 1st Stage 4 Transalsace International
 3rd Omloop Het Nieuwsblad Beloften
 6th Ronde van Vlaanderen U23
2001
 3rd Omloop van het Waasland
2002
 1st Mountains classification, Tour of Belgium
 7th Tro-Bro Léon
 8th Ronde van Midden-Zeeland
2003
 4th Omloop van het Waasland
 6th Trophée des Grimpeurs
 6th Paris–Camembert
 8th Scheldeprijs
2004
 3rd Classic Loire-Atlantique
 5th Dwars door Vlaanderen
 5th Route Adélie
 7th A Travers le Morbihan

References

External links

1976 births
Living people
French male cyclists
Sportspeople from Évreux
Cyclists from Normandy
21st-century French people